Doab Rural District may refer to:

Doab Rural District (Kuhrang County)
Doab Rural District (Lorestan Province)